Benjamin Lariche, (born 16 June 1987 in Narbonne, France) is a French professional racing driver currently driving in the FIA Formula Two Championship.

Racing record

Career summary

Complete FIA Formula Two Championship results
(key) (Races in bold indicate pole position) (Races in italics indicate fastest lap)

Complete GT1 World Championship results

References

External links
 Career statistics from Driver Database

1987 births
Living people
French racing drivers
People from Narbonne
Formule Campus Renault Elf drivers
French Formula Renault 2.0 drivers
Portuguese Formula Renault 2.0 drivers
Formula Renault Eurocup drivers
Formula Renault 2.0 WEC drivers
FIA Formula Two Championship drivers
FIA GT1 World Championship drivers
Blancpain Endurance Series drivers
24 Hours of Spa drivers
Sportspeople from Aude
Graff Racing drivers
La Filière drivers
TDS Racing drivers
GT4 European Series drivers